Harold O. J. Brown (July 6, 1933 - July 8, 2007) was a theologian, professor, activist, and author in the United States. He was a professor of theology at Reformed Theological Seminary (RTS) in Charlotte, North Carolina. 

He was born in Tampa. An evangelical Christian he was part of a pan-Christian movement that developed in the wake of the 1960s counter culture. He cofounded the Christian Action Council which established crisis pregnancy centers.

A lecture series at RTS is named for him.

Books
The Protest of a Troubled Protestant (1969)
 Christianity and the Class Struggle (1970)
 Death Before Birth (1977)
 The Reconstruction of the Republic (1977)
 Heresies: The Image of Christ in the Mirror of Heresy and Orthodoxy from the Apostles to the Present (1984) 
The Sensate Culture (1996)

Articles
”The Passivity of American Christians”

References

This draft is in progress as of October 18, 2022.

American theologians

1933 births
2007 deaths